Alexandre Devissi (3 April 1899 – 5 January 1982) was a Monegasque rower. He competed in the men's coxed four event at the 1928 Summer Olympics.

References

External links
 
 

1899 births
1982 deaths
Monegasque male rowers
Olympic rowers of Monaco
Rowers at the 1928 Summer Olympics
Place of birth missing